Khader Abu-Seif (born ) is a Palestinian copywriter known for his LGBT rights activism.

Life 
Khader Abu-Seif was born  to a Palestinian Muslim family from Jaffa. His grandparents grew up as Palestinians before the formation of the state of Israel. Abu-Seif was raised in Jaffa and is an Arab citizen of Israel.

Abu-Seif works as a copywriter and works for Time Out Tel Aviv. In 2015, Abu-Seif was one of three gay Arab activists profiled in the documentary film Oriented. In March 2016, he was featured as "Celebration #109", an exhibit by photographer Xavier Klaine.

References

External links
 

1988 births
Living people
People from Jaffa
Palestinian human rights activists
Israeli LGBT rights activists
Israeli gay writers
21st-century Palestinian writers
21st-century Israeli writers
Copywriters
Israeli Arab writers
Gay Muslims
Israeli people of Palestinian descent